Julio González may refer to:

Arts and Entertainment
 Julio González (sculptor) (1876–1942), Spanish sculptor
 Julio González, member of Los Chichos gypsy band

Politics
 Julio Gonzalez (Florida politician) (born 1964), member of the Florida House of Representatives,

Sportspeople

Association football
 Julio González (football manager) (born 1953), Uruguayan football manager
 Julio González (footballer, born 1981), Paraguayan football striker
 Julio González (footballer, born 1991), Mexican football goalkeeper
 Julio González (footballer, born 1992), Paraguayan football defender

Baseball
 Julio González (pitcher) (1920–1991), Cuban baseball player
 Julio González (infielder) (born 1952), Puerto Rican baseball player

Boxing
 Julio González (Cuban boxer) (born 1961), Cuban boxer
 Julio César González (1976–2012), Mexican light-heavyweight boxer

Other sports
 Julio González (fencer) (1902–?), Spanish Olympic fencer
 Julio González (sport shooter) (born 1943), Salvadoran sports shooter

Other
 Julio González (arsonist) (1954–2016), Cuban responsible for the 1990 Happy Land Fire